Luke Bourgeois (born 3 March 1977) is a former professional tennis player from Australia.

Career
Bourgeois, who is the youngest of 10 siblings, won the boys' doubles title at the 1995 Australian Open, with Lee Jong-min. They defeated Germans Nicolas Kiefer and Ulrich Jasper Seetzen in the final.

His two singles appearances on the ATP Tour came at the Medibank International, in 2005 (beaten by Andrei Pavel) and 2007 (beaten by Carlos Moyá). In his loss to Moyá, he held a match point, before losing in a third set tiebreak.

Bourgeois competed in the main draw of the Australian Open three times, all in the men's doubles. In 2003, he made the second round, with Scott Draper.

Challenger titles

Doubles: (4)

References

1977 births
Living people
Australian male tennis players
Australian Open (tennis) junior champions
Tennis people from New South Wales
Grand Slam (tennis) champions in boys' doubles
21st-century Australian people